Ilaria Stagni (born November 10, 1967) is an Italian voice actress.

Biography
Born in Milan and the daughter of voice dubbers Vittorio Stagni and Lorenza Biella, Stagni began her career in the 1980s. She is typically known for her dubbing of male children. In fact, She was the official Italian dub voice for Bart Simpson in The Simpsons from 1991 until 2012 when she was replaced by Gaia Bolognesi and among the most popular characters she dubbed include Macaulay Culkin as Kevin McCallister in Home Alone, Barret Oliver as Bastian Balthazar Bux in The Neverending Story.

Among the actresses Stagni has dubbed includes Jennifer Lopez, Winona Ryder, Eva Longoria, Charlize Theron, Lauren Graham, Mira Sorvino, Jessica Biel, Samantha Morton and more. In her animated roles, Stagni dubbed Jessie in the Toy Story franchise, the title character in Pocahontas, Terk in Tarzan and Jerry in Tom and Jerry: The Movie.

Personal life
Stagni is the ex-wife of the late dubbing director Anton Giulio Castagna. They have one son, Jacopo, who is a voice actor.

Dubbing roles

Animation
Bart Simpson in The Simpsons (seasons 1-22)
Bart Simpson in The Simpsons Movie
Azteca in Antz
Jerry in Tom and Jerry: The Movie
Pocahontas in Pocahontas
Pocahontas in Pocahontas II: Journey to a New World
Pocahontas in Ralph Breaks the Internet
Jessie in Toy Story 2
Jessie in Toy Story 3
Jessie in Toy Story 4
Jessie in Toy Story of Terror!
Jessie in Hawaiian Vacation
Jessie in Small Fry
Jessie in Partysaurus Rex
Honker Muddlefoot in Darkwing Duck
Chel in The Road to El Dorado
Nerdluck Bupkus in Space Jam
Birdbrain Mary in Treasure Planet
Terk in Tarzan
Terk in Tarzan II
Terk in Tarzan & Jane
Terk in The Legend of Tarzan
Baby Bear in Shrek
Slappy Squirrel in Animaniacs
Slappy Squirrel in Wakko's Wish
Bridget in An American Tail
Julian Clifton in Postman Pat
Bubbles and Misty in Ice Age: Collision Course
Babs in Chicken Run
Gazelle in Zootopia
Jack-Jack Parr in Incredibles 2
Daniela Paguro in Luca
Michelle in ChalkZone

Live action
Kevin McCallister in Home Alone
Kevin McCallister in Home Alone 2: Lost in New York
Mary Fiore in The Wedding Planner
Paulina in Shall We Dance?
Charlie Cantilini in Monster-in-Law
Jean Gilkyson in An Unfinished Life
Maya Vargas in Second Act
Ramona Vega in Hustlers
Gabrielle Solis in Desperate Housewives
Jill Marin in The Sentinel
Consuelo Cantrow in The Heartbreak Kid
Kate Spencer in Over Her Dead Body
Celeste Martin in The Baytown Outlaws
Eva Longoria in In a World...
Grace in Dog Days
Bastian Balthazar Bux in The Neverending Story
Elena Márquez in Dora and the Lost City of Gold
Sue in Bad Santa
Claire Fletcher in The Pacifier
Joan Baxter in Evan Almighty
Luann Mitchler in A Merry Friggin' Christmas
Jill Young in Mighty Joe Young
Laura Kensington in The Curse of the Jade Scorpion
Jill Price-Grey in Weeds
Nola Rice in Match Point
Sondra Pransky in Scoop
Kay Lake in The Black Dahlia
Cristina in Vicky Cristina Barcelona
The Female in Under the Skin
Molly in Chef
Lucy Miller in Lucy
DeeAnna Moran in Hail, Caesar!
Corky in Night on Earth
Nola in Celebrity
Charlotte Fielding in Autumn in New York
Nicola Anders in Simone
Siri Taylor in The Darwin Awards
Gillian De Raisx in Sex and Death 101
Nyota Uhura in Star Trek
Nyota Uhura in Star Trek Into Darkness
Nyota Uhura in Star Trek Beyond
Peter Pan in Finding Neverland
Vada Sultenfuss in My Girl
Carolina in Once Upon a Time in Mexico
Frida Kahlo in Frida
Francesca Giggles in Spy Kids 3-D: Game Over
Elena Sánchez in Savages
Salma Hayek in Muppets Most Wanted
Moaning Myrtle in Harry Potter and the Chamber of Secrets
Moaning Myrtle in Harry Potter and the Goblet of Fire
Leslie / Linda Ash in Mighty Aphrodite
Ruth Wheldon in Reservation Road
Amy Benic in At First Sight
Romy White in Romy and Michele's High School Reunion
Wendy Porter in Like Dandelion Dust
Connie James in The Hurt Locker
Éowyn in The Lord of the Rings: The Two Towers
Éowyn in The Lord of the Rings: The Return of the King
Penny Pacino in Confessions of a Dangerous Mind
Billie Offer in Lucky You
Rosie Goode in Everybody's Fine
Ingrid Cortez in Spy Kids
Ingrid Cortez in Spy Kids 2: The Island of Lost Dreams
Larita Whittaker in Easy Virtue
Sophie von Teschen in The Illusionist
Catherine in Nightwatch
Katherine "Kissin' Kate" Barlow in Holes
Alice Ayres in Closer
Inés Bilbatúa / Alicia in Goya's Ghosts
Molly Mahoney in Mr. Magorium's Wonder Emporium
Sabrina in City of Ghosts
Briseis in Troy
Helen Harris in Bridesmaids

Video games
Bart Simpson in The Simpsons Game

References

External links
 
 
 

1967 births
Living people
Actresses from Milan
Italian voice actresses
Italian voice directors
20th-century Italian actresses
21st-century Italian actresses